Xenophon Constantine Balaskas (15 October 1910 – 12 May 1994), sometimes known as Xen or Bally, was a South African all-rounder who scored 2,696 first-class cricket runs at 28.68 and took 276 wickets at 24.11 with his leg-spin bowling.

Born in Kimberley to Greek immigrant parents, Balaskas made his first-class debut for Griqualand West in 1926/27, but did not really break through until 1929/30. In that year he topped both the runs and wickets lists in the Currie Cup by taking 39 wickets at 21.20, including five five-wicket hauls, and scoring 644 runs at over 80, including a career-best 206 against Rhodesia.

The following season he made his Test match debut at Johannesburg's Old Wanderers ground, but made no impact, scoring 7 and 3 and bowling just two overs in the match. The second Test at Cape Town proved only slightly better: South Africa recorded an innings victory, but Balaskas made a duck and took 2–104 in the match; he was dropped for the rest of the series.

In 1931/32 he toured Australia and New Zealand with South Africa, but could make the Test side only for the second leg of the tour, repaying the selectors with his only Test century, 122 not out at Wellington. His next Test appearances came in England in 1935, and it was there at Lord's (his only appearance of the series) that he produced the best bowling performance of his career, recording splendid analyses of 32–8–49–5 and 27–8–54–4 to help his country to their first Test victory on English soil.

Balaskas took nine wickets in three Tests against Australia the following winter, and playing for Transvaal took 8–60 against Western Province in 1937/38, but there was to be only one further international appearance, against England at Cape Town in 1938/39, and a return of 0–115, together with the coming of World War II, sealed his fate as a Test cricketer. He resumed his domestic cricket career after the war, and enjoyed a fine 1945/46 season when he took 47 wickets at 15.95, but after a couple of matches the following year he hung up his bat for good.
Balaskas has the third-lowest Test Match batting average of any player who has made a century, with 14.50.

He died in Hyde Park, Johannesburg at the age of 83.

References

External links

1910 births
1994 deaths
Border cricketers
Gauteng cricketers
Griqualand West cricketers
South Africa Test cricketers
South African cricketers
Western Province cricketers
South African people of Greek descent
Cricketers from Kimberley, Northern Cape